Thysbina femoralis is a species of leaf beetle of Senegal and the Democratic Republic of the Congo. It was first described by Édouard Lefèvre in 1877.

References

Eumolpinae
Beetles of the Democratic Republic of the Congo
Taxa named by Édouard Lefèvre
Beetles described in 1877
Insects of West Africa